Lucija Grad (born 22 October 1983) is a Slovenian football forward.

External links 
 

1983 births
Living people
Slovenian women's footballers
Slovenia women's international footballers
Women's association football forwards